Daniel Kemmis (born December 5, 1945) is an American author and former politician. Kemmis served as the minority leader and speaker of the Montana House of Representatives and mayor of Missoula, Montana.

Early life and education 
Daniel Kemmis was born December 5, 1945, in Fairview, Montana. He received a Bachelor of Arts degree in government from Harvard University and a Juris Doctor from the Alexander Blewett III School of Law.

Career
Kemmis was elected to the Montana House of Representatives in the 1974 general election. He eventually rose to be the speaker of the House in the 1983–1984 session. Kemmis was elected mayor of Missoula, Montana, in 1989 and re-elected in 1993.

Since retiring from politics, Kemmis has been active on many public and non-profit boards, especially in the field of philanthropy. He was a member of the boards of the Kettering Foundation, the Northwest Area Foundation, and Philanthropy Northwest.

Books
Community and the Politics of Place, University of Oklahoma Press, 1990. 
The Good City and the Good Life: Renewing the American Community, Houghton Mifflin, 1995. 
This Sovereign Land: A New Vision for Governing the West, Island Press, 2001. 
Citizens Uniting to Restore our Democracy, University of Oklahoma Press, 2020

References

1945 births
Living people
Harvard University alumni
Mayors of Missoula, Montana
University of Montana alumni
Writers from Missoula, Montana
National Humanities Medal recipients
Speakers of the Montana House of Representatives
Democratic Party members of the Montana House of Representatives